We Are Tonight is the fifth studio album by American country music singer Billy Currington. It was released on September 17, 2013 via Mercury Nashville. The album includes the singles "Hey Girl" and "We Are Tonight".

Content
Currington told Country Weekly that he wanted the album to be "completely happy". Unlike his previous four albums, Currington did not write any of the songs on We Are Tonight.

Among the tracks are a cover of Jack Johnson's "Banana Pancakes", from his album In Between Dreams, and a duet with Willie Nelson on "Hard to Be a Hippie". According to Currington, the song ended up as a duet with Nelson because Currington had told co-writer Scotty Emerick, a mutual friend of the two, that he wanted to record the song; when Emerick said that Nelson wanted to record it, Currington then suggested that they do it as a duet.

Critical reception

We Are Tonight has generally received positive reviews from music critics. Stephen Thomas Erlewine of Allmusic told that "none of [Currington’s] moves feel self-conscious", and that album was "guaranteed to create some nice mellow vibes." Jon Freeman of Country Weekly said that "Billy is a skilled interpreter of songs with a knack for finding the soul in every selection." He generally praised the song selection, but criticized the title track for "fall[ing] back on the small-town truck-riding clichés so prevalent at the moment." Matt Bjorke of Roughstock felt that "We Are Tonight mixes traditional country elements with soul elements and contemporary elements and turns it into a sound that is uniquely and unquestionably Billy Currington." Tara Toro at Got Country Online wrote that the album "will hook ya." Rob Burkhardt of Music Is My Oxygen affirmed that "We Are Tonight is a focused and well-produced record that plays to Billy Currington’s strengths and puts him in the running to be an A-list performer", and that "Time alone will tell whether enough fans will catch on to Currington’s unique style, but this is definitely a record worthy of the attention." Chuck Yarborough of The Plain Dealer stated that the album was "so disappointing. It’s not that it’s all that up-tempo – although most of it is – it’s just that none of it FEELS like it’s coming from a country guy pretending to be a pop guy pretending to be a country guy."

Track listing

Personnel
Adapted from liner notes

Tracks 3, 4, 6–9
Shy Carter – background vocals & rap on "Banana Pancakes"
J.T. Corenflos – electric guitar
Billy Currington – lead vocals
Paul Franklin – steel guitar
Wes Hightower – background vocals
Paul Leim – drums
Brent Mason – electric guitar
Gary Prim – Hammond B-3 organ, keyboards, piano
Karyn Rochelle – background vocals
Chris Rodriguez – background vocals
W. David Smith – bass guitar
Biff Watson – acoustic guitar

Tracks 1, 2, 5
Tom Bukovac – electric guitar
Billy Currington – lead vocals
Paul Franklin – steel guitar
Steve Herrman – trumpet
John Hinchey – trombone
Jim Hoke – baritone saxophone, tenor saxophone
Dann Huff – electric guitar
Charlie Judge – Hammond B-3 organ, keyboards
Chris McHugh – drums
Jimmie Lee Sloas – bass guitar
Russell Terrell – background vocals
Ilya Toshinsky – acoustic guitar
Jonathan Yudkin – fiddle

Track 10
Joe Ayoub – bass guitar, acoustic guitar, electric guitar, snaps
Shy Carter – beat box, bells, harmonium, mandolin, percussion, background vocals
Billy Currington – lead vocals
L.J. Holifield – drums
Ahmed Oliver – tenor guitar, organ, MPC, sugar shaker, percussion
Andy Rose – clavinet, Fender Rhodes, piano, synthesizer
Marcus Thomas – background vocals
Brad Warren – acoustic guitar
Brett Warren – acoustic guitar

Chart performance
The album debuted on the US Billboard 200 at number 10, and at number five on the Top Country Albums chart, selling 26,000 copies in its first week in the US. It sold 41,000 copies in three weeks.

Weekly charts

Year-end charts

Singles

References

2013 albums
Billy Currington albums
Mercury Nashville albums